
Notable people named Chukwuka include:

Surname
 Chioma Chukwuka,  Nigerian actress
 Cyril Chukwuka Anyanwu,  Anglican bishop in Nigeria
 Humphrey Chukwuka, retired Nigerian Army Major
 Okoli Chukwuka, Nigerian male weightlifter
 Samuel Chibueze Chukwuka, Anglican Bishop of the Church of Nigeria
 Utazi Chukwuka, Nigerian politician

Given name
 Chukwuka Onuwa Emmanuel, Nigerian footballer

Surnames of Nigerian origin